The Big Questions is an interfaith dialogue and ethics television programme usually presented by Nicky Campbell. It is broadcast live on BBC One on Sunday mornings, replacing The Heaven and Earth Show as the BBC's religious discussion programme.

Format

The format is loosely based on BBC One's political discussion show, Question Time, though it also contains elements that are more familiar to daytime chat shows. In the first four series, each show featured four panellists from a range of different religious and ethical perspectives, as well as a number of contributors from the live studio audience. In Series 5, the panel was dropped, and the debates took place entirely within the audience, which still featured a number of contributors.

Each week, panel and audience debate three ethical, moral or religious topics which featured in the week's news.

Guests

Panellists have included notable atheist Richard Dawkins, convert to Roman Catholicism Ann Widdecombe, Imam Ibrahim Mogra, Muslim commentator Mohammed Ansar, Rabbi Laura Janner-Klausner, Scottish philosopher John Joseph Haldane, Bible scholar Francesca Stavrakopoulou, Lord Carey, Jonathan Bartley, Peter Hitchens, Alexander Goldberg, Ian McMillan, Andrew Pinsent, Stephen Law, Tommy Robinson, Michael Nazir-Ali, Samuel Westrop, Peter Tatchell and Decca Aitkenhead.

The programme used to have a slot for a celebrity interview in which a famous person talks about their life and their moral, ethical and religious beliefs and interests. Such celebrities have included Richard Dawkins, Annie Lennox, John Barrowman, Benjamin Zephaniah, John Simpson and Jamelia. In the second series this section was dropped, and the whole programme instead concentrates on the three discussions.

The programme's 250th episode was 3 June 2018.

Presenters

Nicky Campbell has presented the show since it began in 2007. Campbell was initially joined by Sonia Deol during the first 14 episodes of series one in February 2008. Deol no longer appeared after this.

During series 3 in June 2010, Campbell was absent from the programme. Kaye Adams guest presented the programme on these dates. Campbell then returned from his absence to present the final show in July 2010.

Programme information
The programme is produced for the BBC by Mentorn Media (owned by Tinopolis).

From July 2010, The Big Questions''' breaks and its slot was filled with a new studio-based religious and ethics discussion programme, Sunday Morning Live hosted by Sean Fletcher and Cherry Healey (formerly Susanna Reid, Samira Ahmed, Sian Williams, Naga Munchetty and Emma Barnett). The Big Questions runs from January to July, and Sunday Morning Live'' runs from July until November.

References

External links

2007 British television series debuts
2010s British television series
2020s British television series
BBC Television shows
British religious television series
English-language television shows